Zielona Góra Główna (Polish for Zielona Góra Main station) is a railway station in Zielona Góra, the largest city in Lubusz Voivodeship, Poland. According to the classification of passenger stations in Poland, it belongs to Voivodeship station. In 2018, the station served approximately 4,400 passengers a day.

History
The station was built in 1871, when the city of Zielona Góra (German: Grünberg) was part of the German Empire. The current station building was built in the 1960s, and it was completely renovated during the 2000s to 2010s.

Train services
Zielona Góra Główna has train connections to Gorzów Wielkopolski, Zbąszynek, Rzepin, Warsaw, Frankfurt (Oder) and Krakow, main cities of the surrounding regions: Poznań, Szczecin and Wrocław as well as direct international connections to Berlin, Vienna.

The station is served by the following service(s):
EuroCity services (EC) (EC 95 by DB) (IC by PKP) Berlin - Frankfurt (Oder) - Rzepin - Wrocław – Katowice – Kraków – Rzeszów – Przemyśl
Intercity services (IC) Swinoujscie - Szczecin - Kostrzyn - Rzepin - Zielona Gora - Wroclaw - Katowice - Kraków
Intercity services (IC) Gdynia - Gdańsk - Bydgoszcz - Poznań - Zielona Góra
Intercity services (IC) Zielona Góra - Wrocław - Opele - Częstochowa - Kraków - Rzeszów - Przemyśl
Intercity services (TLK) Lublin Główny — Świnoujście
Regional services (R) Zielona Gora - Rzepin - Frankfurt (Oder)/Kostrzyn 
Regional services (R) Goerlitz (Görlitz station) - Żary - Zielona Góra Główna 
Regional services (R) Gorzów Wielkopolski - Zbąszynek - Zielona Góra Główna 
Regional services (R) Guben - Zielona Góra Główna 
Regional services (R) Wrocław - Głogów - Zielona Góra Główna 
Regional services (R) Jelenia Góra - Zielona Góra Główna

References

External links
 

Railway stations in Poland opened in 1871
Railway stations in Lubusz Voivodeship
Buildings and structures in Zielona Góra